Crown Flatt, currently known as the FLAIR Stadium for sponsorship purposes, is a rugby league stadium in Dewsbury, West Yorkshire, England. It is the home of the Dewsbury Rams, who play in the Championship. The ground occupies the site of the former Shaw Cross Colliery, which closed in August 1968.

Crown Flatt was also the name of a stadium at a different site in the town which was Dewsbury's home ground from 1876 until 1991. It was severely damaged by an act of arson in 1988, and was demolished in 1991 to be replaced by a residential estate.

History

The original stadium
On 19 January 1876, Mr A. Fearnsides – a Savile estate tenant – had agreed to sub-let the field to Dewsbury Athletic and Football Club for an initial payment of £20 per year.

The earliest surviving reference to the Crown Flatt enclosure is the one goal to nil defeat by Leeds Caledonians on 22 January 1876.

In season 1879/1880 the ground acquired its first permanent structure - a wooden terrace occupying the top side of the estate. At around the same time, and at a cost of £250, the field acquired a perimeter wall, turnstiles, viewing platforms and a refreshment tent.

Improved changing facilities appeared during the 1884/85 campaign. "Noah’s Ark" - a 3,500-seater grandstand purchased from the Royal Agricultural Show at Preston for £170 was erected along the southern touchline in time for the visit of Morley on 26 September 1885. In 1890, Crown Flatt hosted its first international rugby union match when it was used as England's first venue after a two-year absence from the Home Nations Championship due to the RFU's refusal to join the International Rugby Board. This game is notable as it was the first occasion England had lost to Wales, with the only try scored by a Dewsbury player, Wales's 'Buller' Stadden.

In November 1897, the committee of Dewsbury and Savile Football and Athletic Club decided to abandon rugby union in favour of soccer and in mid-1898, to vacate Crown Flatt.

In September 1898 after rejecting an approach from the new Northern Union tenants, the Dewsbury and Savile committee received notice to remove their property from the ground before the end of the month. By 17 September both the wooden top stand and "Noah’s Ark" opposite had been dismantled and the remains were sold to the local Poor Law Union for use as firewood.

In the summer of 1936, Crown Flatt became the home of Dewsbury Royals Professional Baseball Club. However, attendance figures were very disappointing, and without the financial backing which other clubs received, Dewsbury could not attract quality foreign players and struggled to compete with the bigger clubs. The club was soon disbanded after the 1936 season.

Crown Flatt's only grandstand, built in 1914 - the other three sides of the ground remained open and largely undeveloped for many years - was destroyed in an act of arson on the evening of 13 September 1988, when three youths set fire to it. All the club’s memorabilia and its documentary records, stored in the board room, were lost. Following the disaster, Dewsbury continued to play on at Crown Flatt for three more years, with a temporary metal stand being provided by local firm Duncan Developments, who subsequently bought the entire site for redevelopment and built the modern housing estate that stands there today, the streets of which are named after notable Dewsbury players. The ground staged its final first class game on 14 April 1991 when Barrow were held to a 19-19 draw. Dewsbury full-back Nathan Graham, with a late conversion, registered the last senior points to be scored at the ground. The club then spent three seasons ground-sharing with local rivals Batley at Mount Pleasant stadium.

The development and construction of a new stadium for Dewsbury was overseen by the club committee, with the first part of the work done by the then president David T Farrow JP who died in 1991, before he could see the new stadium completed.

New stadium
Dewsbury played their first home game at the newly built Crown Flatt stadium (often erroneously termed 'New Crown Flatt') on 6 September 1994 in front of a full house against Barrow, a match they won 76-8.

The Rams suffix was adopted by the club in 1996 as part of rugby league's transition from a winter to a summer schedule. Crown Flatt stadium was renamed Ram Stadium in 1998. In 2005, the stadium was renamed Tetley's Stadium for commercial sponsorship purposes.

The car parks to the south of the stadium hold one of the biggest car boot sales in the region, raising much needed revenue for the Community Trust run by the club.

In 2020 Bradford Bulls moved to the stadium to ground-share as Dewsbury’s tenant, on an initial two year deal.

Layout
North StandCapacity- 900 (seated)The stadium's main stand is completely covered and runs along the side of the pitch. It incorporates 900 seats, hospitality boxes, club administrative office and also the players' changing rooms, tunnel and team dugouts.

East StandCapacity-  (standing)The east stand or Owl Lane End is the newest part of the stadium, having been completed in 2015. It is situated behind the posts and is uncovered terracing. It also houses the scoreboard.

South StandCapacity-  (standing)'''The South Stand is the only area of standing terracing that is covered and runs along the side of the pitch, opposite and parallel to the North Stand.

West End
This is a simple grass bank, with no cover or stand, at the western end of the ground behind the posts. It is mostly occupied in summer, when spectators can sit and view from the grass.

Rugby League Test matches
Crown Flatt hosted two rugby league internationals in its history.

Sponsors

References

Buildings and structures in Dewsbury
Sport in Dewsbury
Rugby league stadiums in England
Dewsbury Rams
Sports venues in West Yorkshire